In Medicine, abdo is short for abdominal.

As a name, notable people called Abdo, Abdou or Abdu include:

People
A masculine Arabic name, and a nickname for Abdul. The name is also of Syriac origin and is a variant of 'Abdā, meaning 'servant' or 'slave'.

Given name
Abdo Al-Edresi (born 1986), Yemeni football player 
Abdou Alassane Dji Bo (born 1979), Nigerien judoka
Abdou Cherif, Moroccan singer
Abdou Diouf (born 1935), second president of Senegal
Abdou Doumbia (born 1990), French footballer
Abdou Soulé Elbak (born 1954), president of the autonomous island of Grande Comore
Abdo Hakim (born 1973), Lebanese actor and voice actor
Abdu al-Hamuli (1836–1901), Egyptian musician
Abdo Hussameddin (born 1954), Syrian politician and minister
Abdo Khal (born 1962), Saudi Arabian author
Abdou El-Kholti (born 1980), French footballer
Abdoh Otaif (born 1984), Saudi Arabian football player
Abdou Sall (born 1980), Senegalese footballer
Abdu Shaher, English martial artist
Abdo al-Tallawi, Syrian general killed in the Siege of Homs in 2011
Abdou Traoré (born 1981), Malian football player

Middle name
Ali Abdu Ahmed, Eritrean politician
Mario Abdo Benítez, Paraguayan politician
Adnan Abdo Al Sukhni (born 1961), Syrian politician and minister

Surname
Ahmed Abdou (born 1936), Comorian politician
Ali Abdo (football chairman), Iranian Australian boxer and founder of Persepolis Athletic and Cultural Club and Chairman of Persepolis F.C. 
Ali Abdo (wrestler) (born 1981), Australian freestyle wrestler
Fifi Abdou (born 1953), Egyptian belly dancer and actress
Geneive Abdo (born 1960), American journalist, scholar and author 
Jay Abdo (born 1962), Syrian American actor
John Abdo, American health and fitness expert, businessman, nutritionist and motivational speaker
Hamse Abdouh (born 1991), Palestinian swimmer
Hussam Abdo, suicide bomber
Jimmy Abdou (born 1984), Comorian footballer
Kate Abdo (born 1981), English TV sports presenter and journalist
Mohammed Abdo (born 1949), Saudi singer 
Naser Jason Abdo (born 1990), American former US Army Private First Class of Jordanian origin. American conscientious objector and sentenced in 2012 with terrorism-related charges 
Reza Abdoh, American theatre director
Reema Abdo (born 1963), Canadian backstroke swimmer and Olympian 
Tom Abdo (1894–1967), American poker player

Other uses
 Association of British Dispensing Opticians

See also
Abu Abdo or Abu Abdo al-Fawwal, famous ful parlor in Aleppo, Syria 

Surnames of Nigerien origin